Augustus (63 BC – 14 AD) was the first emperor of ancient Rome.

Augustus may also refer to:

Title
 Augustus (honorific), a title generally used by Roman Emperors

People

People with the name
 Augustus (given name)
 Emanuel Augustus, boxer
 Ernest Augustus (disambiguation), numerous people
Ernest Augustus, Elector of Hanover (1629–1698), father of King George I of Great Britain
Ernest Augustus, Duke of York and Albany, Prince-Bishop of Osnabrück, son of the Elector of Hanover
Ernest Augustus, King of Hanover (1771–1851), son of King George III of the United Kingdom
Ernest Augustus, Crown Prince of Hanover, (1845–1923), son of George V of Hanover
Ernest Augustus, Duke of Brunswick (1887–1953), son of the Crown Prince of Hanover
Prince Ernest Augustus of Hanover (1914–1987), son of the Duke of Brunswick
Ernest Augustus I, Duke of Saxe-Weimar-Eisenach (1688–1748)
Ernest Augustus II, Duke of Saxe-Weimar-Eisenach (1737–1758), son of Ernest Augustus I, Duke of Saxe-Weimar-Eisenach
 Frederick Augustus III of Saxony (1865–1932), the last King of Saxony
 John Augustus (1785–1859), a Boston boot maker known as the "Father of Probation"
 Philip Augustus (1165–1223), King of France
 Sigismund II Augustus

People with the title
 Augustus, Elector of Saxony (1526–1588)
 Augustus II the Strong (1670–1733), King of Poland and Elector of Saxony
 Augustus III of Poland (1696–1763), King of Poland and Elector of Saxony
 Augustus the Younger, Duke of Brunswick-Lüneburg (1579–1666), Duke within the Holy Roman Empire

Places 
 Augustus Island, Nunavut, Canada
 Augustus Lutheran Church, a Lutheran church building in Trappe, Pennsylvania, US
 Fort Augustus Abbey, Scotland, UK
 House of Augustus, a palace in Rome, Italy
 Mount Augustus National Park, a national park in Australia

Arts, entertainment, and media

Literature 
 Augustus (Massie novel), a 1986 novel by Allan Massie
 Augustus (Williams novel), a 1973 novel by John Edward Williams

Monuments 
 Arch of Augustus (disambiguation)
 Augustus of Prima Porta, a Roman statue
 Trophy of Augustus, Grande Corniche
 Via Labicana Augustus, a Roman statue

Ships 
 MS Augustus (1952), a luxury Italian ocean liner
 MS Augustus (1926), a luxury Italian ocean liner

Other uses
 Agaricus augustus, a species of mushroom

See also 
 August (disambiguation)
 Augusta (disambiguation)
 Augustus Waller (disambiguation)
 Augusts (given name)
 Prince William Augustus, Duke of Cumberland (1721–1765), son of George II
 Temple of Augustus (disambiguation)
 Wars of Augustus